Procometis stenarga is a moth of the  family Oecophoridae. It is found in Australia, where it has been recorded from Queensland.

Males have ochreous coloured segments of the apices and abdomen. The abdomen of the females, as well as the cilia, and hindwings are grey coloured. Both sexes have rounded hindmargins, as well as a rounded apex. The forewings are elongated and the legs are both dark and white. The middle of the rib is almost white coloured.

References

Procometis
Moths described in 1902